Queens of Mystery is a British comedy-drama murder-mystery series created by Julian Unthank currently airing on SVOD provider Acorn TV, starring Julie Graham (Cat Stone), Siobhan Redmond (Jane Stone), Olivia Vinall (Matilda Stone-Series 1), Florence Hall (Matilda Stone-Series 2), and Sarah Woodward (Beth Stone). In the first series, Vinall stars as Matilda Stone, a young detective who has been assigned to the constabulary in her fictional hometown village of Wildemarsh, England, where she is reunited with her three crime-writing aunts Cat, Beth, and Jane, played by Graham, Woodward, and Redmond. Florence Hall took over the role of Matilda Stone in Series 2. Queens of Mystery is Acorn TV's second entirely original production.

The first series was released in 2019 and comprises three separate stories, each split across two 45-minute episodes. Queens of Mystery was renewed for a second series in March 2021, which premiered on 29 November 2021.

Cast

Guest stars

Episodes

Series overview

Series 1 (2019)

Series 2 (2021)

Home Media

Production
Julie Graham was attracted to the script's portrayal of older women, explaining that "Cat, Jane, and Beth... are all in their fifties... it was a joy to see scenes about authentic females in a family. It's unusual and it's important and of this moment", while Olivia Vinall said the series "feels really truthful [about] the way the women behave." Graham also called Queens of Mystery "very tongue-in-cheek and cartoonish."

Filming for the first season took place in Kent, specifically in Stone Street in Cranbrook.  Production used Lympne Castle as Hiddledean Castle in the fictional town of Wildemarsh in the Murder In The Dark episode. The series visited several locations in Farningham, Beth’s cottage was filmed at Mill Estate. Wadard Books doubled as the Murder Ink bookshop and Jane’s house. Farningham Village Store also featured as Wildemarsh Village stores and the Entrance to The Corn Exchange Theatre. In the Death By Vinyl episode Stoneydale craft shop in Cranbrook was converted into The Sound and Fury record shop. Cranbrook also features as the High street throughout the series. St Michael's Churchyard in Smarden was used as the Wildemarsh churchyard and a private residence in Water Lane featured as the village's Embittered Hack Pub. The police station is filmed at the old school building in Benenden, alongside the village green and church in the backdrop.

Critical reception
The New York Times recommended the series due to its "whimsical" tone, noting its "fairy-tale-style omniscient narrator" and comparing it favorably with Pushing Daisies. Writing for TV Insider, Matt Roush found Queens of Mystery to be in the same vein as Murder, She Wrote, yet inferior to sibling Acorn TV series Agatha Raisin.

References

External links
 

2019 British television series debuts
2010s British comedy-drama television series
2020s British comedy-drama television series
2010s British mystery television series
2020s British mystery television series
English-language television shows
Television series about sisters
Television shows about writers
Television shows set in the United Kingdom
British detective television series